Hole is a Scraping Foetus Off the Wheel album released in September 1984.  It was the first Foetus material released by Self Immolation through Some Bizzare.  In 1995, Hole was given a US re-release by Thirsty Ear.

Hole is Self Immolation #WOMB FDL 3.

Track listing 

A vinyl test pressing is released which includes two additional tracks "Sick Man Edit" [1:07] (end of LP side 1) and "Cold Day In Hell Edit" [1:14] (end of LP side 2). Both are edited versions of the originals.

Bonus 12" 
Some copies of the original LP release were packaged with a 12" containing bonus tracks.  These tracks later appeared, variously, on Wash/Slog, Finely Honed Machine, and Sink.
"Wash It All Off" – 6:05
"Sick Minutes" – 8:43
"Halo Flamin' Lead" – 4:51
"Finely Honed Machine" – 9:23
"Today I Started Slogging Again" – 7:34

Personnel 
Charles Gray – engineering
Warne Livesy – engineering
J. G. Thirlwell (as Scraping Foetus Off The Wheel) – instruments, production, illustrations

Charts

References

External links 
 
Hole at foetus.org

1984 albums
Foetus (band) albums
Albums produced by JG Thirlwell
Some Bizzare Records albums